Madonna Tassi is a Canadian vocalist.

Her first album with IMMI Records of Knoxville, Tennessee, the 13-cut Man Of My Dreams, was released April 26, 2005.

"My Mother" is the album's lead single, which she co-wrote with her regular producer, Antonio Pulsone. It was produced by award-winning record producer Norro Wilson.

Background

Born and raised in Newfoundland and Labrador, Tassi, and the youngest in a family of 15 children, has been performing publicly since she was five, beginning as a member of the Hagerty Family group. She fronted her own band when she was 13. She later moved to Ontario and became prominent as a jingle singer in Toronto's thriving commercial music scene. Her first nationally broadcast single was "My Heart's An Open Invitation."

Discography

Albums

Singles

References

https://web.archive.org/web/20060312005601/http://www.xpresspress.com/news/immirecords_041205.html
http://www.encyclopedia.com/doc/1G1-131361170.html
[ AllMusic.com - Madonna Tassi]

External links
Official site

Year of birth missing (living people)
Living people
Musicians from Newfoundland and Labrador
Canadian women country singers